Charles August Albert Dellschau (4 June 1830 Brandenburg, Prussia – 20 April 1923 Houston, Texas) was a Prussian-American who gained posthumous fame after the discovery of his large scrapbooks that contained drawings, collages and watercolors of airplanes and airships. He has been classified as one of the first visionary artists.

Life
Little is known about Charles Dellschau's life. Primary sources are scarce and secondary sources often contain contradictory information. It is known that he emigrated from Brandenburg, Prussia to Texas in 1850, where he worked as a butcher. In 1860, Dellschau received his letter of citizenship in Fort Bend County, and in 1861 he married Antonia Hilt, the widow of Pierre Hilt, who already had a daughter from her previous marriage. Charles Dellschau's marriage to Antonia took place in Richmond, Texas., and at some point after the marriage, Charles started working as a sales clerk in his in-laws' saddlery shop. In addition to his stepdaughter, Dellschau had three children: two daughters, Bertha and Mary, and a son, Edward, who died in 1877 at age 6. Dellschau's wife, Antonia, died in the same year, leaving her husband a widower at age 47.

In 1865 Dellschau signed the Civil War Amnesty Oath, indicating that he was a soldier for the Confederate States Army. In this document Charles Dellschau is described as a fair complexioned man of 5'3" with auburn hair and hazel eyes.

After his retirement in 1899, he lived with his stepdaughter and her husband, and worked in their attic apartment in Houston, Texas, where he filled at least 13 notebooks with drawings, watercolor paintings, and collages depicting fantastical airships. He died at the age of 93, and was buried in the Washington cemetery in Houston in Stelzig Plot A-70. On his grave marker, the last name is misspelled as "Dellschaw," probably as a result of the "u" being written with an elongated tail on his death certificate. His grave marker also lists his initials on as C. A. instead of C. A. A.

Posthumous recognition
After his death, Dellschau's home remained in the hands of his descendants. His notebooks of paintings and drawings, as well as his diaries were left virtually untouched for half a century until the late 1960s. Following a fire, the house was cleared and at least 12 of the notebooks were placed on the sidewalk to be discarded. Fred Washington, a local antiques and used furniture dealer, spotted the books, and for $100 bought them from the trash collector. The books sat undisturbed in Washington's store under a pile of discarded carpet for over a year. In 1968, Mary Jane Victor, an art student at the University of St. Thomas in Houston stumbled upon the notebooks, and persuaded Washington to lend some of them to the university for a display on the story of flight. She also brought them to the attention of art patron and collector Dominique de Menil. Mrs. de Menil purchased four of the notebooks for $1,500. Of the remaining books, seven were purchased by Peter (Pete) G. Navarro, a Houston commercial artist and UFO researcher. After studying them, Navarro sold four of the notebooks to the Witte Museum in San Antonio, and the San Antonio Museum of Art. One notebook ultimately ended in the private abcd (art brut connaissance & diffusion) collection in Paris belonging to Bruno Decharme, a French filmmaker and art collector. The rest of the notebooks ended up in private hands. Some were dismantled and single pages were sold. In 2016, a double sided page dated 1919, sold for $22,500 at Christie's.

Dellschau's earliest known work is a diary dated 1899, and the last is an 80-page book dated 1921-1922, giving his career as an artist a 21-year span. His work was in large part a record of the activities of the "Sonora Aero Club," of which he was a purported member.

Dellschau's writings describe the club as a secret group of flight enthusiasts who met in Sonora, California in the mid-19th century. According to Dellschau, one of the club members discovered a formula for an anti-gravity fuel called "NB Gas."  The club mission was to design and build the first navigable aircraft using the NB Gas for lift and propulsion. Dellschau called these flying machines Aeros. Dellschau never claimed to be a pilot or a designer of any of the airships; he identifies himself only as a draftsman for the Sonora Aero Club. His collages incorporate newspaper clippings (called "press blooms") of then-current news articles about aeronautical advances and disasters.

Though Dellschau's work mentioned names of purported Sonoro Aero Club members, research of census records, voting rosters, and death records has found nothing to substantiate the existence of this group, though a few gravestones in the Columbia Cemetery share identical surnames. It is speculated that, like the voluminous "Realms of the Unreal" notebooks by outsider artist Henry Darger (1882-1973), the Sonora Aero Club is a fiction by Dellschau. However, according to UFO writer Pete Navarro, a coded story is hidden throughout the drawings, which he interprets to mean that the Sonora Aero Club was a branch of a larger secret society known only as NYMZA who developed advanced aeronautic techniques decades earlier than is commonly believed, and which might be connected to the mystery airships reported in the late 1800s.

Dellschau's first one-person exhibition "Charles Dellschau - Aeronautical notebooks" and its accompanying catalogue was held in 2000 at the Ricco/Maresca Gallery in New York City, some 75 years after his death.

Witte (which mounted an exhibition of Dellschau and Da Vinci called "Flights of the Imagination") and the San Antonio Museum (which curated a solo exhibition of Dellschau entitled "Flight or Fancy? The Secret Life of Charles A. A. Dellschau", also shown at the Menillo Museum in Florida) and the Menil Collection. Dellschau's artwork is also in the collection of the Philadelphia Museum, the abcd Art Brut collection in Paris, which owns an entire book, the High Museum in Atlanta, the American Folk Art Museum in New York, the Philadelphia Museum of Art, the John Michael Kohler Art Center, and several prominent private collections in America and Europe. Several Dellschau drawings were put on display at the Museum of Everything, London England in 2009 as well as in Turin in 2010. The American Visionary Museum in Baltimore has shown the work of Dellschau on several occasions and the INTUIT Museum in Chicago presented a one-person exhibition of Dellschau's art in September 2012.

Charles Dellschau's life and art is the subject of a monograph released in the spring of 2013 produced by Marquand Books, Stephen Romano and distributed by Distributed Art Publishers with essays by Thomas McEvilley, Tracy Baker-White, Roger Cardinal, James Brett, Thomas Crouch, Barbara Safarova and Randall Morris.  The book has been reviewed in Raw Vision magazine by Tom Patterson, as well as in Bookforum, and Intuit magazine.

Critical analysis
Dellschau is regarded as one of America's earliest visionary artists.  His work has been interpreted as a testimony to the sense of optimism that new technologies inspire as they change the way people see the world.  Flight, up until that time, had been a metaphor for man's pathos - or his inability to accomplish what he was not meant to. Dellschau's work is also remarkable in that it uses the medium of watercolor brilliantly, often using water as the medium with a subtle tint of color.

Dellschau's work shows the influence of circus banner painting, in its use of centralized subjects and ornamental borders, and often possesses a jewel-like quality.  Reviewing the 1998 Ricco Maresca exhibition, the New York Times said: 

The book The Secrets of Dellschau by Dennis Crenshaw and Pete Navarro tells the story of Dellschau and of the secrets the authors argue that Dellschau hid within his artwork. Pete Navarro spent 27 years studying Dellschau's drawings and writings.  According to Navarro, the story of the Sonora Aero Club and their achievements had been cleverly hidden by Dellschau in his drawings using several codes and unconnected sentences hidden throughout the work. Thus, one would have to see all of Dellschau's to understand the narrative.

Partial list of exhibitions
"The Sky is the Limit" - University of St. Thomas, Houston, Texas, 1969
"The I at Play" - Institute of Arts, Rice University, Houston, Texas, 1977
"Texas Selections from the Menil Collection" - Galveston Art Center, Galveston, Texas, 1991
"Wind In My Hair" - American Visionary Museum, 1996
"Aeronautical Notebooks" - Ricco Maresca Gallery, 1998
"Plots and Inventions" - Ramapo College, New Jersey, 2000
"Visionary Dreamers" - University of Syracuse, New York, 2002
"Flight or Fancy? The Secret Life of Charles A. A. Dellschau" - San Antonio Museum of Art, Focus Gallery, 2002
"The Secret Life of Charles Dellschau" - San Antonio Museum, Menilo Museum, 2004 
"Eye of the World: Miniature and Microcosm in the Art of the Self Taught" - Addison Gallery of American Art, Pennsylvania, 2002
"American Self Taught from the High Museum" - High Museum Annex, 2005
"Dopes, Dupes, and Demagogues: Viewed by Outsiders" - Louise Ross Gallery, 2004
"Create and Be Recognized: Photography on the Edge" - Southeastern Center for Contemporary Art (SECCA), 2005
"Inner Worlds Outside" - Whitechapel Gallery, London, 2005
"Flights of Imagination" - Witte Museum, San Antonio, 2008
"ARTnow" contemporary art fair - Stephen Romano booth #21, New York NY, 2008
"Messages and Magic: Collage and Assemblage in American Art" - John Michael Kohler Arts Center, Sheboygan, Wisconsin, 2008
"Artists Books Through Time: Vol. 1", Cavin Morris Gallery, New York, 2009
Museum of Everything", London, England. 2009 -
Museum of Everything", Pinacoteca Agnelli, Turin, Italy. 2010 -
"Outsider Art Fair", Stephen Romano Booth #11, New York NY, 2011
"Seeing Stars: Visionary Drawing from the Collection", Menil Collection, Houston, TX, 2012
"All Things Round" - American Visionary Art Museum, Baltimore, MD, 2011 - 2012
"Darker Stars: The Roots of Steampunk Art", Cavin Morris Gallery, New York, 2012
"Jubilation/Rumination: Life, Real and Imagined", American Folk Art Museum, 2012
"Museum of Everything", Paris, France. 2009 -
"Farfetched", curated by Roger Manley and Tom Pattersen, Gregg Art Museum  2013
"Restless II", Cavin Morris Gallery, New York, 2013
"PULSE Art Fair New York 2013", Stephen Romano Booth B6 2013
"Outsider Art Fair Paris 2013", Cavin Morris Gallery 2013
"The Metro Show", New York, Stephen Romano Gallery 2014, 2015.
"Welcome To The Dreamtime", Stephen Romano Gallery New York 2014
"Mysterium Cosmograhicum", Stephen Romano Gallery New York 2014
"Abundae Cornu Copea", Stephen Romano Gallery New York 2014 -2015
"Opus Hypnagogia", Morbid Anatomy Museum New York 2015
"Lexicon Infernali", Stephen Romano Gallery New York 2015
"Charles Dellschau (1830 - 1923): American Visionary", Stephen Romano Gallery New York 2015
"Till It's Gone", The Istanbul Museum of Modern Art 2016
"Materia Prima", BLAM Gallery, Brooklyn, 2016
"STATIM FINIS", Stephen Romano Gallery 2016
"Outsider Art Fair", Stephen Romano Gallery 2017
"Art Basel Miami", Andrew Edwin Gallery 2016
"Outsider Art Fair", John Ollman Gallery 2018
"The Armory Show", John Ollman Gallery 2018
"SCOPE Art Fair", Stephen Romano Gallery 2018
"The Museum of Everything", The Gallery of Old and New, Tasmania 2017 - 2018
"Outsider Art From Texas", The Webb Gallery, Texas 2018
"Vestiges & Verse: Notes from the Newfangled Epic", American Folk Art Museum 2018
"L'Envol", La Maison Rouge, Paris 2018
""Out of This World: Artists Explore Space", curated by Larry Gagosian for the 2018 Seattle Art Fair's Gagosian Gallery booth August 2018
Outsider Art Fair, New York, January 2019
"Opening the Third Eye", Stephen Romano Gallery, October 2018
"Charles Dellschau and the Mythology of Flight", Curated by Brian Chidester, Brooklyn Antiquarian Book Fair, October 2019
Outsider Art Fair, Paris, October 2019, Galerie Arthur Borgnis
"Supernatural America" organized by the Minneapolis Art Institute, curated by Robert Cozzolino on view at The Toledo Museum of Art through Sept. 5, 2021, October 7, 2021 – January 2, 2022: Speed Art Museum, February 19 – May 15, 2022: Minneapolis Institute of Art.

See also
 Mystery airship

Notes and references

External links

 Charles Dellschau website, Stephen Romano Private Art Dealer, New York
 Charles A. A. Dellschau Dreams of Flying: The Amazing Story of an Airship Club That Might Never Have Existed by Rebecca J. Rosen
 DESIGN OBSERVER: Dreams of the Sonora Aero Club by John Foster
 SLATE.COM Steampunk Before Steampunk Existed: Charles Dellschau's Fantastic Airships by Rebecca Onion
 MARQUAND BOOKS/D.A.P.  Charles Dellschau  Text by Thomas McEvilley, Roger Cardinal, James Brett, Thomas D. Crouch, Barbara Safarova, Randall Morris, Tracy Baker-White.
 Darker Stars: The Roots Of Steampunk Art with Dellschau, Darger, etc at Cavin Morris Gallery, New York, Online Catalog
 Collection ABCD Paris Charles A.A. Dellschau
 HYPERALLERGIC Early-20th-Century Drawings of Fanciful Flying Machines
 DISINFO  NYMZA Aeros – Charles Dellschau and The Secret Airships of the 1850s
 MESSY NESSY Found in a Junk Shop: Secrets of an Undiscovered Visionary Artist
 HOUSTON PRESS Secrets of the Sonora Aero Club
 PHILADELPHIA MUSEUM OF ART Untitled (Broad Center/Gander) Charles A. A. Dellschau
 Beautiful Drawings by an Unknown Butcher who Dreamed of Flight

1830 births
1924 deaths
Outsider artists
Prussian emigrants to the United States
American butchers
People of Texas in the American Civil War
Writers from Houston
Artists from Texas